Shyam Sunder Singh Dheeraj is a former Minister in Bihar Government and former member of the Bihar Legislative Assembly. Currently Shri Dheeraj is a state working president of Bihar Pradesh Congress Committee.

References

Indian National Congress politicians
Living people
Year of birth missing (living people)
Members of the Bihar Legislative Assembly
Indian National Congress politicians from Bihar